María Luisa Guiu Medina (December 2, 1942 – April 11, 2012) was a Spanish singer, actress and television presenter.

Biography
She started at TVE as a dedicated announcer reading scripts for cultural programs. She made her debut before the cameras in Spain in 1962 in the program En antena. Subsequently made numerous appearances in many other programs, mainly during the sixties and seventies. She made some forays into the world of cinema and song, to share the stage with Julio Iglesias. In 2000, she collaborated in some programs of Telecinco, such as "TNT" by Jordi González.

Personal life
In 1970 Medina married the composer Alfonso Santisteban, with whom she had three daughters. They divorced in 1994.

On May 9, 2009, Medina appeared in the television program DEC, on Antena 3, speaking about colon cancer and hepatocarcinoma. On  August 27, 2010, in an interview on the program "Sálvame Deluxe", she confirmed that she had one or two years to live.

Medina died on April 11, 2012, at age 69 due to colon and liver cancer.

Published books
 In 1967 she published the book of poetry Quien espera.
 In 2003 she wrote the autobiography Canalla de mis noches.

Awards
In 1967 received the award Golden antenna.

Featured works in television
 Escuela TV (1962)
En antena (1963-1965) 
 Fin de semana (1963-1968) 
 Manos al volante (1968) 
 Noches de Europa (1968)
 Nivel de vida (1968-1970) 
 Todo es possible en domingo (1974)
 Andante (1977) 
 625 líneas (1979-1981)
 Vamos a ver  (1981)
 Próximamente (1982) 
 Llave en mano (1991)

Work in film
 Si Fulano fuese Mengano (1971) 
 La casa de los Martínez (1971) 
 En un mundo nuevo (1972) 
 Las señoritas de mala compañía (1973) 
 Vida íntima de un seductor cínico (1975)
 Eva, limpia como los chorros del oro (1977)
 La loca historia de los tres mosqueteros (1983)

References

1942 births
2012 deaths
Spanish film actresses
Spanish television presenters
Place of birth missing
Place of death missing
Deaths from cancer in Spain
Deaths from colorectal cancer
Deaths from liver cancer
20th-century Spanish poets
Spanish autobiographers
20th-century Spanish musicians
20th-century Spanish women singers
20th-century Spanish singers
Women autobiographers
Spanish women television presenters